Petr Horáček (born 11 January 1974) is a Czech boxer. He competed in the men's super heavyweight event at the 1996 Summer Olympics.

References

External links
 

1974 births
Living people
Czech male boxers
Olympic boxers of the Czech Republic
Boxers at the 1996 Summer Olympics
Sportspeople from Prague
Super-heavyweight boxers